Claudio Bisio (born 19 March 1957) is an Italian actor, presenter, voice actor, comedian, and writer.

Early life 
Bisio was born in Novi Ligure, Piedmont, and raised in Milan, Lombardy. He attended scientific lyceum Luigi Cremona of Milan and graduated from drama school of Piccolo Teatro of Milan.

Career 
Bisio started his career as theatre actor performing classical and modern drama; he began his movie career in 1983 with Come dire... (How to say). His first major appearance on TV was in 1998 during Zanzibar, an Italian TV show. He has been the presenter of Zelig, an Italian sketch comedy, for 13 years (in 1997 and from 2000 to 2012).

In 2009, he played in Ex and gained a David di Donatello nomination for best supporting actor.
In 2010 he was the protagonist of Benvenuti al Sud (Welcome to the South) and Maschi contro femmine (Males vs Females) and in 2011 of Benvenuti al Nord (Welcome to the North) and Femmine contro maschi (Females vs Males).

In the Italian version of the Ice Age series, Bisio is the voice of Sid (one of the protagonists of the film). He is also the voice of Count Dracula in the Italian version of Hotel Transylvania.

In the summer of 2014 has been announced he will be part of Italia's Got Talent jury for its sixth series, aired in 2015 by the pay-TV Sky Uno.

Personal life 
Bisio is married to Sandra Bonzi. He has two children, Alice and Federico.

He is an atheist.

Filmography

As actor

As voice actor

Television

As presenter 
 Striscia la notizia (1992)
 Zelig (1997, 2000–2012)
 Mai dire Gol (1997–1999)
 Le Iene (2001)
 Concerto del Primo Maggio (2004–2006)
 Gran premio internazionale dello spettacolo (2007)
 Italia's got talent (2015–present)
 Saturday Night Live Italia (2018)

Plays (theatre)

As actor 
 Sogno di una notte di estate, 1981 (G. Salvatores)
 Nemico di Classe (di N. Williams), 1983 (Elio De Capitani)
 Café Procope, 1985 (G. Salvatores)
 Comedians (di T. Griffiths), 1985 (G. Salvatores)
 Accidental Death of an Anarchist, 1987 (Dario Fo)
 Guglielma, 1990 (Gigio Alberti)
 Aspettando Godo, 1991 (Paola Galassi)
 Le nuove mirabolanti avventure di Walter Ego, 1993
 Tersa Repubblica, 1994–1995
 Monsieur Malaussène au théâtre (di Daniel Pennac), 1997–2001 (G. Gallione)
 La buona novella (di Fabrizio De André), 2000–2001 (G. Gallione)
 Appunti di viaggio, 2002 (G. Gallione)
 I bambini sono di sinistra, 2003 (G. Gallione)
 Grazie (di Daniel Pennac), 2005 (G. Gallione)
 Coèsi se vi pare (with Elio e le Storie Tese), 2006

Bibliography 
 Quella vacca di Nonna Papera 1993.
 Prima comunella poi comunismo 1996. .
 I bambini sono di sinistra 2005
 Doppio misto. Autobiografia di coppia non-autorizzata 2008

Discography 
Paté d'animo (1991)

References

External links 

Interview with Claudio Bisio at Eurochannel

1957 births
Italian atheists
Living people
People from Novi Ligure